Isoentomon is an animal genus of proturans in the family Eosentomidae.

Species
 Isoentomon atlanticum (Condé, 1947)
 Isoentomon hauseri (Nosek, 1972)
 Isoentomon myrmecobium Tuxen, 1975
 Isoentomon paulista Tuxen, 1975
 Isoentomon pluviale Tuxen, 1975
 Isoentomon pseudosaharense (Tuxen, 1967)
 Isoentomon pumilio (Bonet, 1950)
 Isoentomon pumiliodes Tuxen, 1977
 Isoentomon serinus Szeptycki, 2004
 Isoentomon setigerum (Condé, 1949)
 Isoentomon sylvicola Tuxen, 1975

References

Protura